Hajji Mamian (also Romanized as Ḩājjī Māmīān, Ḩājjī Mā Mīān, and Ḩājjī Mamiyan) is a village in Mangur-e Sharqi Rural District, Khalifan District, Mahabad County, West Azerbaijan Province, Iran. At the 2006 census, its population was 179, in 21 families.

References 

Populated places in Mahabad County